Yu with breve is equal to (Ю̆ ю̆; italics: Ю̆ ю̆) in the letter of the Cyrillic script.

Yu with breve is used in the Khanty language.

See also
Cyrillic characters in Unicode

Cyrillic letters with diacritics
Letters with breve